Rizwe Mohammed (known as Mohammed Ibrahim Mohammed Rizwe) is the President of All Ceylon Jamiyyathul Ulama. Since 2003, Mufti M.I.M. Rizwe has been the President of All Ceylon Jamiyyathul Ulama (ACJU), the supreme body of Islamic Theologians in Sri Lanka, inaugurated in 1924, incorporated by the Parliamentary Act No. 51 of 2000.

He plays an active role in his capacity as a Mufti (Judge) and as the President of ACJU that has more than 7,000 members as Scholars with an Executive Committee of 33 erudite scholars, running this organisation with its 155 branches throughout the island in 24 districts.

Getting his primary and secondary education at  Kingswood College, Kandy he continued his education until he read M.A. in Arabic. He got specialised in Islamic Jurisprudence in 1988.

He started his career as a teacher while involved in research and development in writing commentary on books written by great scholars. From his childhood he shined as an eloquent speaker. Due to his talent of factual and realistic speech he was called internationally to Conferences, Seminars and Consultations. Thus, he has visited Malaysia, Indonesia, Saudi Arabia, Turkey, Kyoto (Japan), etc.

He has also travelled to several countries in Asia, Middle East, Africa, Europe and North America for the purpose of Islamic awareness, Islamic education and promoting peace and coexistence.

His profession is Advisor-Financial Institution, presently providing his consultation and advisory services to Amana Investments, Amana Takaful, Bank of Ceylon, Peoples Leasing in Sri Lanka, Maldives Islamic Bank and Male Izumi Enterprise, Japan.

Education 

1965 - 1977	Primary and secondary education at Kingswood College, Kandy, Sri Lanka

1978 - 1986	Al Alimiyya Course at Jamiyyathul Uloomil Islamiya
		Karachi, Pakistan

1986 - 1988	MA Arabic & MA Islamiyya qualifying at the Shahaadhathul Alimiyya Examinations, Wifaqul Madarisil Arabiya, Pakistan

1988		Specialized in Islamic Jurisprudence (Al Takhassus Fil Fiqhil Islami)
		Jamiyyathul Uloomil Islamiya, Pakistan

National Commitments
a)	President of All Ceylon Jamiyyathul Ulama (ACJU), an organization that plays an active role as the Islamic religious higher authority of Sri Lanka with more than 6,000 active members and Ex Officio President of various committees of the ACJU such as Education, Fatwa, Halaal, Hilaal, Publications, Maktab, Propagation, Islamic Economics & Finance, Social Services and Council of Corporation & Coordination.

b)	Advisor on Non Interest Banking for following leading Financial Institutions in Sri Lanka

 a.	Amana Investment Ltd, 
 b.	Amana Takaful Ltd, 
 c.	Bank of Ceylon, 
 d.	Peoples Leasing

c)	Founder & the Director of Islamic Careline Counseling (Guarantee) Limited, which provides individuals with the support and service to overcome underlying problems. In this spirit, Careline provides services such as counselling and training, striving to build a better society overall through its efforts and especially to address problems of women

d)	Founder Member of Mahmoud Institute, which was established for the sole purpose of developing the skills of Scholars to face the current challenges prevailing in the community

e)	Member of the Inter Religious Advisory Board for His Excellency the President of Sri Lanka since May 2016 and an Executive Member of the Supreme Council of Congress of Religions – Sri Lanka

f)	President of the Board of Directors & Advisor to a numerous Arabic Colleges in locally as well as internationally.

g)	Lecturer at Rashad Arabic College, for last 2 decades in the field of Science of Hadith.

International Commitments
a)	Member of the Shariah Board of Maldives Islamic Bank
b)	Adviser Izumi Enterprise, Japan

Personal Achievements
a)	Mufti M.I.M. Rizwe is very well known as a Peace Lover and who has promoted Peace and harmony across the globe for the last 3 decades even before holding the position as President at ACJU.

b)	He has done more than 25,000 lectures in the last 3 decades in promoting peace and coexistence in the community locally as well as internationally.

c)	Under the leadership and guidance of Mufti M.I.M. Rizwe a team collectively worked in developing strategies to bridge Unity among the Muslim Community and to Co-exist with other faiths. As a result, two important declarations were derived and published under ACJU:

1.	 Declaration of Unity (http://www.acju.lk/en/published/item/664-declaration-of-unity)
2.	Declaration of Coexistence (http://www.acju.lk/en/published/item/565-declaration-of-coexistence)

d)	Mufti M.I.M. Rizwe has also been selected among the 500 most influential Muslims worldwide. The evaluation is done annually by the Royal Islamic Strategy Study Centre based in Amman, Jordan (www.rissc.jo) (http://themuslim500.com/profile/m-i-m-rizvi-mufthi).

Major Conference Attended
e)	Attended International Conference ‘Religions for Peace’ held in Kyoto, Japan

f)	Presented paper on ‘Education and its importance to Muslim Minorities in non Muslim Asian Countries’ at International Conference on ‘Jurisprudence of Minorities in the Light of the Objectives of Islamic Law’ (Maqasidal Al Shariah) organized by Rabita, World Muslim League, jointly organized by International Institute of Islamic Thought and Civilization and the Department of Fiqh and Usul Al Fiqh – Malaysia

g)	Presented a Paper on “Good Citizenship and Obedience to Those in Authority” in Malaysia,

h)	Presented a paper on “The New Movements of Thoughts in Islamic World and Their Adverse Effects on Muslim Nations in Asia Pacific Countries: With reference to the Sri Lankan Context” at Muslim Religious Leaders’ Summit in Turkey, Istanbul.

i)	Attended International Conference “World Muslim Minorities Summit” held in Istanbul, Turkey and “High level Consultations of World Muslim Scholars on Wasatiyyat al – Islam” held in Bogor, Indonesia.

j)	Mufti M.I.M. Rizwe conducted and attended several programs in Asian, Middle Eastern, African, European and North American countries for the purpose of Islamic awareness, Islamic education and promoting peace and coexistence.
thumb

References

External links

M.I.M. Rizvi Mufthi Bio Data

Ash Sheikh Mufthi Rizwe

thumb

Living people
Alumni of Kingswood College, Kandy
20th-century imams
21st-century imams
1941 births
Presidents for All Ceylon Jamiyyathul Ulama